The American Pie Council (APC) is an organization committed to "preserving America's pie heritage and promoting America's love affair with pies." As America's only purely pie-focused national organization, the APC combines aspects of a hobby club, professional association, trade group, and pro-pie lobby.

Activities
The APC offers both personal and commercial memberships which allow individual participants to have discussions and swap recipes with fellow pie lovers, while providing commercial members with business networking opportunities and promotional support. The APC has run the APC National Pie Championships since 1995, usually held in Celebration, Florida. The competition is open to amateur, professional, and commercial bakers. There are 16 categories of pie including chocolate, pumpkin, and “Paramount Peach,” among others.

The APC also sponsors or promotes other pie-centric events throughout the year. The APC council also conducts surveys of pie consumption. APC research has shown that Apple is Americans' favorite pie, that 59% of Americans consider pie an appropriate late-night snack, and that 20% of Americans have eaten an entire pie.

National Pie Day 

National Pie Day, which is held annually on January 23, is now sponsored by the APC since 1986. The holiday was started in the mid-1970s by Boulder, Colorado teacher Charlie Papazian after he declared his birthday to be National Pie Day. This should not be confused with Pi Day which the U.S. Congress recognizes as March 14.

In 2014, the APC partnered with Paramount Pictures in promoting the romantic thriller film Labor Day in conjunction with National Pie Day. (A pie-making scene features prominently in the film, and the film's general release was within a few days of National Pie Day.)

The APC distributed a promotional poster to pie shops and bakeries featuring images of the film's stars Kate Winslet, Josh Brolin, and Gattlin Griffith in the pie-making scene. New York Post writer Lou Lumenick noted dryly that the scene was an "eccentric choice for a promotion" since Brolin's character is an escaped murderer and "before they all make pies together, he abducts them from a supermarket and ties both of them up... A bond does emerge between Brolin and his hostages before he surrenders to police. But still." The poster is captioned in part "It makes the time we spend together, just a little sweeter. Pie. Grab a slice of life."

(Notwithstanding any problematic overtones, though, Variety'''s take on the scene was "What damage [the 1999 film] American Pie did for the pie industry, Labor Day'' has reversed.")

Publications

See also
 List of food days
 List of pies, tarts and flans

References

External links
 

Culinary professional associations
Professional associations based in the United States
Food industry trade groups
Trade associations based in the United States
Clubs and societies in the United States
Hobbyist organizations based in the United States
American pies